Anthony Olubunmi Okogie (born 16 June 1936) is a Nigerian Cardinal Priest and Archbishop Emeritus of Lagos in the Roman Catholic Church.

Biography

Born in Lagos, Nigeria, Okogie was born to a royal family of Uromi in Edo State. His parents were Prince Michael Okojie - who was himself a son of King Ogbidi Okojie of Uromi - and Mrs Lucy Adunni Okojie (née Afolabi). His father was Esan and his mother was Yoruba. Okogie was ordained priest on 11 December 1966. He holds a licentiate in sacred theology, and had planned to study in Rome, but was called to Nigeria where he was a curate at the Holy Cross Cathedral. He was drafted into the Nigerian army, and served there as a chaplain. After another period of service at Holy Cross Cathedral, he was an instructor at King's College.

In 1971, he was consecrated Titular Bishop of Mascula and Auxiliary of Oyo, and in 1973 named archbishop. As Archbishop, Okogie was the president of the Christian Association of Nigeria, and, from 1994 to 2000, headed the Bishops' Conference of Nigeria.

Cardinal Okogie volunteered to die in place of a Muslim woman who had been condemned to death by stoning by an Islamic court for adultery.

He was proclaimed Cardinal by Pope John Paul II in the consistory of 21 October 2003, and holds the title of Cardinal Priest of Santa Maria del Monte Carmelo a Mostacciano (or in English Blessed Virgin Mary of Mt. Carmel of Mostacciano). During his cardinalate, Okogie was one of the cardinal electors who participated in the 2005 papal conclave that selected Pope Benedict XVI. Cardinal Okogie was also one of the cardinal electors who participated in the 2013 papal conclave that elected Pope Francis. During the opening day of the 2013 conclave, Cardinal Okogie was notable in that he was the one cardinal who was in a wheelchair during most of the proceedings, standing up only when it came time for him to walk towards the gospels and make the cardinal electors' oath. During the procession and entry into conclave, Cardinal Okogie was the one cardinal from the Latin church who did not wear the mozzetta.

His resignation from the pastoral governance of the see of Lagos because of having reached the age limit of 75 years was accepted on 25 May 2012.

Views

Condoms
In 2007, he condemned the government approval of a condom factory.

Celibacy
Cardinal Okogie has defended the Catholic Church's laws on celibacy for Catholic priests.

American culture
Okogie has been critical of American culture, especially as it relates to priestly vocations. He said "those people there, in the US, they don’t value anything any more. And how do you want priests to come from a place like that?”

References

External links

 
Biography at catholic-pages.com

1936 births
Living people
Nigerian cardinals
Nigerian Roman Catholics
20th-century Roman Catholic archbishops in Nigeria
21st-century Roman Catholic archbishops in Nigeria
Roman Catholic archbishops of Lagos
Christian Association of Nigeria Presidents
Cardinals created by Pope John Paul II
Residents of Lagos
Yoruba Christian clergy
Roman Catholic bishops of Oyo